Anna Cove is a cove immediately east of Cape Anna at the north end of the Arctowski Peninsula, along the west coast of Graham Land. Charted by the Belgian Antarctic Expedition on January 30, 1898, and named in association with Cape Anna.

References

Coves of Graham Land
Danco Coast